Khan Manuel is an Australian rock and fusion guitarist. He has played and recorded with many other Internationally recognized guitarists including Frank Gambale, Nuno Bettencourt among others.

Early life 
Khan Manuel was born in New Zealand. Learning to play guitar from his father at the early age of 10, he later studied at The Southern Institute Of Technology in Invercargill, NZ. During this time he played in various cover bands in New Zealand. At 16 Manuel won the open Joe Satriani guitar competition held by Ibanez Australia. 

In 2001 Manuel moved to Sydney, Australia.

Career 
In 2008 The Knight peaked at number 1 on two charts in the U.S. and was reviewed in Hardrock Haven, Guitar World, and other guitar magazines. Manuel also began endorsing Iconic guitar makers Ibanez guitars. The limited edition Australian Southern Cross model is Manuel's guitar of choice as well as the Steve Vai white Ibanez Jem.

In 2010 Manuel collaborated with Frank Gambale on a composition written by Manuel entitled "When Two Become One". The song was recorded in Sydney Australia and Los Angeles.

Style and equipment 
Manuel is known for his sense of melody and use of counterpoint melodies. The style of Joe Satriani, Steve Vai in combination with George Benson, Stevie Ray Vaughan and Frank Gambale best describes Manuel's technique. He primarily uses Ibanez guitars with minimal foot pedals consisting only of a distortion pedal and Boss digital delay with a Roland Jazz Chorus amplifier. He also uses Maton acoustic guitars.

References

External links
 
 
 

Australian rock guitarists
Lead guitarists
Living people
1979 births
21st-century guitarists